Andaman and Nicobar Islands Lok Sabha constituency is the only Lok Sabha (Parliamentary) constituency in the Union Territory of Andaman and Nicobar Islands. It covers the entire union territory.

Until the 1967 general election, the Member of Parliament representing this territory was not elected, but directly appointed by the President of India. After 1967, the member of parliament was elected by adult franchise. The first elected member of parliament was K. R. Ganesh. He is the only elected member from this constituency to serve as a minister at the central government. Manoranjan Bhakta has won 8 times from this constituency. As of the latest election in 2019, the current MP representing this constituency is Kuldeep Rai Sharma of the Indian National Congress.

Members of Parliament

Election results

General Election 1967

General Election 1971

General Election 1977

General Election 1980

General Election 1984

General Election 1989

General Election 1991

General Election 1996

General Election 1998

General Election 1999

General Election 2004

General Election 2009

General Election 2014

General Election 2019

See also
List of Constituencies of the Lok Sabha

External links
2019 Andaman & Nicobar islands Lok Sabha Constituency Election Results and Candidates List
Andaman and Nicobar Islands Lok Sabha Seat Results
Andaman and Nicobar lok sabha constituency election 2019 date and schedule

References

Constituencies of the Lok Sabha
Politics of the Andaman and Nicobar Islands
1956 establishments in the Andaman and Nicobar Islands
Constituencies established in 1956
Elections in the Andaman and Nicobar Islands